This page details the records and statistics of the Copa Libertadores. The Copa Libertadores is an international premier club tournament played annually by the top football clubs of South America. It includes 3–5 teams from all ten CONMEBOL members plus Mexico, whose clubs are sometimes invited as guests to the tournament. It is now held from January to November and it consists of eight stages.

The data below does not include the 1948 South American Championship of Champions, as it is not listed by CONMEBOL either as a Copa Libertadores edition or as an official competition. It must be pointed out, however, that at least in the years 1996 and 1997, CONMEBOL entitled equal status to both the Copa Libertadores and the 1948 tournament, in that the 1948 champions (Vasco da Gama) were allowed to participate in the Supercopa Libertadores, a CONMEBOL official competition that allowed participation for former Libertadores champions only (for example, not admitting participation for champions of other CONMEBOL official competitions, such as the Copa CONMEBOL).

General performances

By club

By country

By department, province or state

By city

All-time top ten table
The list is current as of the end of 2021 edition. Last updated 6 December 2021.

CONMEBOL club ranking
This ranking is used for seeding in the qualifying and group stage draws of the Copa Libertadores, and is based on a club's performance in the last 10 years of the Copa Libertadores, its historic performance in the competition, and its performance in local championship tournaments. Starting from 2021, the CONMEBOL ranking of the Copa Libertadores was updated to also include Copa Sudamericana performances, and thus was rebranded as the CONMEBOL Clubs Ranking.

This list is current as of 9 December 2022.

Number of participating clubs by country
The following is a list of the 217 clubs that have played at least one match in the Copa Libertadores, updated to the 2022 edition.
Teams in bold: winner of the edition.
Teams in italics: runner-up of the edition.

Clubs

By semi-final appearances

Clubs were finalists in years that are in bold.

By country

By quarter-final appearances

Note: 1) In 1960 and 1961, the tournament started in this round, so teams are not marked as quarter-finalists in the table. 2) From 1962 to 1965, no quarter-finals were played as the tournament had a first stage which consisted of three groups where the winners of each group advanced to semi-finals with the winners of the previous edition. 3) In 1966 and 1967, no quarter-finals were played as the tournament had a first stage with several groups of four, five, six or even seven teams, where the two best teams of each group advanced to semi-finals with the winner of the previous edition. 4) From 1968 to 1970, no quarter-finals were played as the tournament had a first stage with several groups of four or six teams, where the two best teams of each group advanced to the second stage with several groups of two, three or four teams, where the winners of each group advanced to the semi-finals with the winner of the previous edition. 5) From 1971 to 1987, no quarter-finals were played as the tournament had a first stage with five groups of four teams, where the winners of each group advanced to the semi-finals with the winner of the previous edition.

By country

By round of 16 appearances

Note: 1) From 1960 to 1987, no round of 16 was played because of the format of the tournament, or because of the lack of teams.

By country

Specific group stage records

Best group stage

Worst group stage

Unbeaten sides
Seven clubs have won the Copa Libertadores unbeaten, with one of them doing so twice:
Estudiantes had four wins and zero draws in 1969, and three wins and one draw in 1970.
The other unbeaten sides are:
Peñarol with three wins and four draws in 1960
Santos with three wins and one draw in 1963
Independiente with five wins and two draws in 1964
Boca Juniors with four wins and two draws in 1978
Corinthians with eight wins and six draws in 2012
Flamengo with twelve wins and one draw in 2022

Finals success rate

Only one club have appeared in the finals of the Copa Libertadores more than once with a 100% success rate:
Independiente (1964, 1965, 1972, 1973, 1974, 1975 and 1984)

Nine clubs have appeared in the final once, being victorious on that occasion:
Racing (1967)
Argentinos Juniors (1985)
Vélez Sársfield (1994)
Vasco da Gama (1998)
Once Caldas (2004)
LDU Quito (2008)
Corinthians (2012)
Atlético Mineiro (2013)
San Lorenzo (2014)
On the other end, eighteen clubs have appeared in the finals and have never won the tournament. Five of those clubs have appeared in the finals more than once, losing on each occasion:
América de Cali (1985, 1986, 1987 and 1996)
Deportivo Cali (1978 and 1999)
Cobreloa (1981 and 1982)
Newell's Old Boys (1988 and 1992)
Barcelona (1990 and 1998)
Athletico Paranaense (2005 and 2022)

Consecutive participations
Nacional have the record number of consecutive participations, with 25 from 1997 to 2021.

Consecutive finals
Two clubs have appeared in a record four consecutive finals:
Estudiantes (1968, 1969, 1970 and 1971)
Independiente (1972, 1973, 1974 and 1975)

Defending the trophy

Successful title-holder campaigns
As of 2021, 12 of the 61 attempts to defend the trophy (19.6%) have been successful, and this has been accomplished by seven clubs. Until 1999, the title-holders started the competition in the second stage (sometimes third, depending on the format). Since then, only Boca Juniors (in 2001) and Palmeiras (in 2021) have defended their title in the current format, with the previous year's champions starting the tournament in the group stage.

Unsuccessful title-holder campaigns

Of the 25 clubs to win the tournament, 19 have never defended it. Seven of those clubs have won the trophy more than once and had more than one attempt to do so. In 2000 title-holders started participating on group stage, four title-holders have failed to advance past this stage since.

Title-holder campaign by stage

As of 2021, these are the stages the title holders advanced to in the following competition:

Defeating title-holders

Years in bold: winner of the edition.

Defeated champions in a single tournament

Year in bold: winners of that edition.
Club in italics: title-holder.

By number of champions defeated

By number of titles combined

Winning other trophies

Only 2 clubs have the distinction of winning the Copa Libertadores, their national league, and another domestic tournament in the same year/season, known colloquially as the treble:
Santos in 1962, having won the 1962 Copa Libertadores, the Taça Brasil and the Campeonato Paulista. Santos also went on to win the Intercontinental Cup that same year.
Flamengo in 2019, having won the 2019 Copa Libertadores, the Campeonato Brasileiro Série A and the Campeonato Carioca.

In addition to Santos, seven other clubs have achieved a continental double, in which a club won the Copa Libertadores in addition to their domestic league in the same year:
Peñarol in 1960 and 1961
Nacional in 1971 and 1980
Olimpia in 1979
Argentinos Juniors in 1985
River Plate in 1986
Colo-Colo in 1991
Flamengo in 2019

In addition to the double, the following clubs have gone on to win other trophies in that same time frame:
Peñarol won the Intercontinental Cup in 1961
Nacional won the Intercontinental Cup and Copa Interamericana in 1971, and the Intercontinental Cup in 1980
Olimpia won the Intercontinental Cup and Copa Interamericana in 1979
Argentinos Juniors won the Copa Interamericana in 1985
River Plate won the Intercontinental Cup and Copa Interamericana in 1986
Colo-Colo won the Copa Interamericana in 1991

Biggest wins
The largest margin of victory in a single match is nine goals, which occurred twice:
Peñarol defeated Valencia 11–2 in 1970
River Plate defeated Universitario 9–0 in 1970
The largest margin of victory in a single finals match is four goals, done twice by São Paulo:
São Paulo defeated Universidad Católica 5–1 in the first leg in 1993
São Paulo defeated Atlético Paranaense 4–0 in the second leg in 2005

Biggest two-leg win
The largest margin of victory over two legs is fourteen goals, which occurred when River Plate defeated Binacional 14–0 on aggregate in 2020; the scorelines in each match were 8–0 and 6–0.

Most goals in a match
The record number of goals scored in a single match is thirteen, which occurred when Peñarol defeated Valencia 11–2 in 1970.
The most goals scored in a draw is ten, which occurred when Bolívar drew 5–5 with Atlético Paranaense in 2002.
The most goals scored in a single finals match is six. This occurred on three occasions:
Peñarol defeated River Plate 4–2 in the third leg in 1966
São Paulo defeated Universidad Católica 5–1 in the second leg in 1993
LDU Quito defeated Flumeninse 4–2 in the first leg in 2008

Most goals over two legs or more
The most goals scored over two legs is fifteen, which occurred when Peñarol defeated Everest 14–1 on aggregate in 1963; the scorelines in each match were 5–0 and 9–1.
In instances where a third leg was needed, the record number of goals scored is seventeen, which occurred when Peñarol defeated Santos 9–8 on aggregate in 1965; the scorelines in each match were 5–4, 3–2, and 2–1.
The most goals scored over two legs in the finals is ten, which occurred when LDU Quito drew Fluminense 5–5 on aggregate in 2008; the scorelines in each match were 4–2 and 3–1.
In instances where a third leg was needed, the record number of goals scored in the finals is thirteen, which occurred twice:
Peñarol defeated River Plate 8–5 on aggregate in 1966; the scorelines in each match were 2–0, 3–2, and 4–2.
Cruzeiro also defeated River Plate 8–5 overall in 1976; the scorelines in each match were 4–1, 2–1, and 3–2.

Players

Appearances
Ever Almeida holds the record for most matches played with 113 games, all for Olimpia. He is also the only person to have made over 100 appearances in the tournament.

Goalscoring

All-time top scorers
Alberto Spencer is the all-time goalscorer of the Copa Libertadores with 54 goals to his name between 1960 and 1972.

Top scorer award
The top scorer award is for the player who amasses the most goals in the tournament. 
Fernando Morena has received the most awards with three, in 1974, 1975 and 1982, all with Peñarol. 
Five other players have won the award multiple times: 
Alberto Spencer with Peñarol in 1960 and 1962
Oswaldo Ramírez with Universitario in 1972 and 1975
Néstor Scotta (Deportivo Cali) in 1977 and 1978
Salvador Cabañas with América in 2007 and 2008
Gabriel Barbosa with Flamengo in 2019 and 2021
Daniel Onega scored the most goals in a single tournament, with 17 for River Plate in 1966.
Players from Peñarol have received the award the most times, with seven:
Alberto Spencer in 1960 and 1962
Raul Castronovo in 1971
Fernando Morena in 1974, 1975 and 1982
Carlos Aguilera in 1989
Brazil is the nationality that has received the most awards, with 30 Brazilian players finishing as top scorer.

Hat-tricks
The tournament's first hat-trick was scored by Alberto Spencer of Peñarol, when he netted four goals against Jorge Wilstermann on 19 April 1960, in the first ever match in the history of the tournament. 
Thiago Neves is the only player to score a hat-trick in a finals match, doing so for Fluminense against LDU Quito in 2008.

Other goalscoring records
The fastest goal ever scored in the tournament was by Alianza Lima's Félix Suárez, who scored in 6 seconds against Santa Fe on 4 April 1976.
The most goals scored by a single player in a match is six by Juan Carlos Sánchez, in Club Blooming's 8–0 victory over Deportivo Italia on 7 April 1985, and Julián Álvarez, in River Plate's 8-1 victory over Alianza Lima on 25 May 2022.
The youngest player to ever score in the tournament was Ângelo Gabriel, aged 16 years, 3 months and 16 days when he scored for Santos against San Lorenzo on 6 April 2021.

Other records
Alejandro Bernal saw the fastest ever red card in a Libertadores match, being sent off after 22 seconds for Atlético Nacional against Nacional on 11 March 2014.

Most finals victories 

Francisco Sá is the only player to win the tournament six times; he won four titles with Independiente (1972, 1973, 1974 and 1975) and two with Boca Juniors (1977 and 1978).

Most finals defeats 
Antony de Ávila holds the unenviable record of appearing in five finals and losing in all five; four during his time at América de Cali (1985, 1986, 1987 and 1996) and one with Barcelona (1998).

Awards
From 1999 to 2007, Toyota, the main sponsor of the tournament, awarded the best player of the finals. However, in 2008, the company decided to recognise the manager, understanding that they are the main ones responsible for leading the entire team towards victory, combining concepts of reading the game, training, setting goals and strategy, until the final whistle. The last Toyota award was given to Renato Portaluppi in the 2017 edition.

Besides the Toyota Awards, from 2008 to 2012, Banco Santander was the main sponsor of the tournament and elected the best player of the competition; the players awarded were Joffre Guerrón in 2008, Juan Sebastián Verón in 2009, Giuliano in 2010, Neymar in 2011 and Emerson in 2012.

Players
Toyota Award

Santander Award

Bridgestone Award

Bridgestone Ring Award

Managers

Coaches

Records
Carlos Bianchi is the only manager to win the Copa Libertadores four times: once with Vélez Sársfield in 1994, and thrice with Boca Juniors in 2000, 2001 and 2003. 
Carlos Bianchi is the only coach to manage five finalists: Vélez Sársfield in 1994 and Boca Juniors in 2000, 2001, 2003 and 2004.
Four managers have won the tournament with two clubs:
Carlos Bianchi with Vélez Sársfield in 1994 and Boca Juniors in 2000, 2001 and 2003
Luiz Felipe Scolari with Grêmio in 1995 and Palmeiras in 1999
Paulo Autuori with Cruzeiro in 1997 and São Paulo in 2005
Edgardo Bauza with LDU Quito in 2008 and San Lorenzo in 2014
Eight individuals have won the Copa Libertadores as a player, then later as a manager:
Humberto Maschio won as a player in 1967 with Racing and then as a manager in 1973 with Independiente.
Roberto Ferreiro won as a player in 1964 and 1965 and then as a manager 1974, both with Independiente.
Juan Martín Mujica won as a player in 1971 and then as a manager in 1980, both with Nacional.
Luis Cubilla won as a player in 1960 and 1961 with Peñarol and 1971 with Nacional and then as a manager with Olimpia in 1979 and 1990.
José Omar Pastoriza won as a player in 1972 and then as a manager 1984, both with Independiente.
Nery Pumpido won as a player in 1986 with River Plate and then as a manager in 2002 with Olimpia.
Marcelo Gallardo won as a player in 1996 and then as a manager in 2015 and 2018, both times with River Plate.
Renato Portaluppi won as a player in 1983 and then as a manager in 2017, both times with Grêmio.
Three non-South American managers have won the Copa Libertadores:
Mirko Jozić (a Yugoslav at the time) with Colo-Colo in 1991
Jorge Jesus (Portuguese) with Flamengo in 2019
Abel Ferreira (Portuguese) with Palmeiras in 2020 and 2021

Locales

Countries
Argentina has provided the most titles, with 25 titles won by seven different clubs
Brazil has the highest number of different winning clubs, with ten. They have also provided the highest number of different finalists with twelve, and the highest number of different participating clubs, with 27.
On six occasions have two clubs from the same country played each other in the finals, five of them involving Brazilian clubs and one of them involving Argentinian clubs:
 São Paulo vs. Atlético Paranaense in 2005
 Internacional vs. São Paulo in 2006
 River Plate vs. Boca Juniors in 2018
 Palmeiras vs. Santos in 2020
 Palmeiras vs. Flamengo in 2021
 Flamengo vs. Athletico in 2022

Teams from Bolivia, Peru, Venezuela and Mexico have never won the tournament. Teams from Bolivia and Venezuela have yet to provide a finalist.

Cities
The most successful city in the history of the Copa Libertadores is Buenos Aires, which has seen a record five clubs win thirteen total titles.
Fifteen cities have hosted a trophy ceremony. São Paulo has hosted the highest number of trophy ceremonies, with ten ceremonies held in three different stadiums.

Stadiums
As of the end of 2005, 121 stadiums have been used to host Copa Libertadores matches. Estadio Centenario in Montevideo, Uruguay has held the most with 352 matches. 
Estadio Nacional in Santiago, Chile has hosted a record eight trophy ceremonies. 
Three stadiums have hosted matches with attendances in excess of 100,000:
115,000 spectators saw Cruz Azul defeat River Plate 3–0 in a quarter-final match at the Estadio Azteca in 2001.
106,853 spectators saw Cruzeiro defeat Sporting Cristal 1–0 in a finals match at the Estadio Mineirão in 1997.
105,000 spectators saw São Paulo defeat Newell's Old Boys 1–0 in a semi-final match at the Estádio do Morumbi in 1992.
A record twenty-five stadiums in Brazil have been used to host matches.
In 1991, América de Cali and Atlético Nacional played five home matches at the Miami Orange Bowl in Miami, Florida, United States, after their home stadiums were banned. This was the only time a stadium outside of South America or Mexico was ever used until 2018.
In 2018, River Plate became champions after defeating Boca Juniors at the Santiago Bernabéu Stadium in Madrid, for the second leg of the finals. This happened because of problems arranging a reschedule for the match, after crowd incidents before match that was supposed to be played at River Plate's stadium, the Estadio Monumental. This marked the only time a Copa Libertadores champion lifted the trophy outside of the Americas, and the first time in Europe.
In 2019, Flamengo defeated River Plate and became the first champion in a single match final; the Estadio Monumental in Lima held the match, after the final was moved from Santiago.

See also
 List of Copa Libertadores finals
 List of Supercopa Libertadores finals
 List of Copa Sudamericana finals
 List of Copa Libertadores winning players
 List of Copa Libertadores winning managers

References

External links
Official website
Copa Libertadores live scores and statistics
Copa Libertadores live scores and news